The Supreme Court of Justice of Moldova is the highest court in the Republic of Moldova that ensures the correct and uniform application of legislation by all courts of law, settlement of litigation arisen in the process of applying laws, guarantees the state’s responsibility to citizen and citizen’s responsibility to the state.

External links
  Official website
Law Of The Republic Of Moldova On The Supreme Court Of Justice

Government of Moldova
Law of Moldova
Moldova